Vladimir Egorov (born 27 June 1995 in Sakha) is a Russian-born Macedonian freestyle wrestler of Yakut heritage. He won the gold medal in the 57 kg event at the 2022 European Wrestling Championships held in Budapest, Hungary.

Career 

He won one of the bronze medals in the 57 kg event at the 2019 European Wrestling Championships held in Bucharest, Romania. He represented North Macedonia at the 2019 European Games held in Minsk, Belarus in the 57 kg event without winning a medal. In the same year, he also competed in the 57 kg event at the World Wrestling Championships held in Nur-Sultan, Kazakhstan where he was eliminated in his first match by Daton Fix.

In 2020, he competed in the 61 kg event at the European Wrestling Championships held in Rome, Italy. He was eliminated in his first match by Arsen Harutyunyan of Armenia. In March 2021, he competed at the European Qualification Tournament in Budapest, Hungary hoping to qualify for the 2020 Summer Olympics in Tokyo, Japan. He did not qualify at this tournament and he also failed to qualify for the Olympics at the World Olympic Qualification Tournament held in Sofia, Bulgaria.

He won the gold medal in the 57 kg event at the 2022 European Wrestling Championships held in Budapest, Hungary. In the final, he defeated Aliabbas Rzazade of Azerbaijan. He won one of the bronze medals in the 65 kg event at the 2022 Mediterranean Games held in Oran, Algeria. He competed in the 57kg event at the 2022 World Wrestling Championships held in Belgrade, Serbia.

Achievements

References

External links 

 

Living people
1995 births
People from the Sakha Republic
Macedonian male sport wrestlers
European Games competitors for North Macedonia
Wrestlers at the 2019 European Games
European Wrestling Championships medalists
European Wrestling Champions
Mediterranean Games bronze medalists for North Macedonia
Mediterranean Games medalists in wrestling
Competitors at the 2022 Mediterranean Games